Cavinulaceae is a family of diatoms belonging to the order Naviculales.

Genera:
 Cavinula D.G.Mann & A.J.Stickle

References

Naviculales
Diatom families